Cajsa Stina Åkerström is a 1994 CajsaStina Åkerström studio album. and her debut album.

Track listing

Fråga stjärnorna
Änglarna håller hov ikväll
Du (vill se dig igen)
Om jag var din flicka
Minnen
Vill du veta vem jag är
Glöm inte bort
Som en blixt (en klarblå dag)
Alla blickar du gav 
Mirakel

Contributors
Sven Lindvall - bass
Kristoffer Wallman - keyboard
Mattias Torell - guitar
Johan Vävare – synthesizer

Chart positions

References

1994 debut albums
CajsaStina Åkerström albums